Darren Percival is an Australian singer and was the runner-up on the first season of The Voice. His debut album Happy Home reached #3 on the ARIA albums charts and was certified gold. He attended Chatswood High School in Sydney where he featured in musical productions and performed alongside the big band as a jazz vocalist.

Discography

Studio albums

Singles

References

Australian musicians
Living people
1972 births